The documentary Beyond the Steel, filmed over four years, records the relocation of an industrial town in northern Manitoba.
The film was produced and directed by Frank Holmes, a Manitoban filmmaker.
From 1950 to 1953 the town of Sherridon, Manitoba was relocated to Lynn Lake, Manitoba.

The film is preserved in the Manitoba Legislature's official library.

References

Canadian documentary films